The 2023 Milano–Torino was the 104th edition of the Milano–Torino cycling classic. It was held on 15 March 2023 as a category 1.Pro race on the 2023 UCI ProSeries calendar.

The race began in Rho, on the outskirts of Milan, and finished in Orbassano, on the outskirts of Turin

Teams 
Ten of the 18 UCI WorldTeams and seven UCI ProTeams made up the 17 teams that participated in the race. Of these teams, 15 entered a full squad of seven riders, while ,  entered five riders.

UCI WorldTeams

 
 
 
 
 
 
 
 
 
 

UCI ProTeams

Result

References

External links 
  

2023
Milano–Torino
Milano–Torino
Milano–Torino